Tonosho may refer to:

Tōnoshō, Chiba, a town in Chiba Prefecture, Japan
Tonoshō, Kagawa, a town in Kagawa Prefecture, Japan